Ramón Frade de León (March 12, 1875 – November 7, 1954) was a Puerto Rican visual artist and architect. His realist style of painting captured the life of the typical Puerto Rican in the twentieth century.

Early years
Frade (birth name: Ramón Frade de León ) was born in the town of Cayey, Puerto Rico on May 12, 1875. His father died when he was just a child and his mother gave him up for adoption. He was adopted by Nemesio Laforja and his wife who were Spanish nationals. The Laforja family moved back to Spain and in 1885, immigrated and settled down in Santo Domingo the capital of the Dominican Republic. During his youth he traveled to Europe and studied art in Italy. He was also a pupil of the Dominican artist Luis Desangles. The subjects of his first paintings were the Roman ruins in Italy. From (1896 to 1902), Frade traveled to the Dominican Republic and Cuba where he painted scenes of the main colonial cities.

Visual artist
Frade painted portrayals of the life of the Puerto Rican campesinos (country people). What is considered as his masterwork, "El Pan Nuestro de Cada Día" (Our Daily Bread) (1905), represents a "jíbaro" farmer carrying plantains. In his painting he shows what is an old barefooted man who is poor but proud, serious, dignified, clean. This jíbaro is supposed to represent Puerto Rico at the beginning of the century.

Other works by Frade include: "La Planchadora" (The Ironing Lady) (1948), "El Niño Campesino" (the country child), Ensenada, "La Poza", "Reverie", and "La Inmaculada" (The Immaculate) and many others.

Architect
In 1907, Frade returned to his hometown Cayey and, unable to make a living from his paintings, decided to make use of his land-surveyor's degree which he had earned from the University of Sevilla through a mail correspondence course.

During the early part of the 20th century there was a great demand for additional housing, infrastructures and tobacco warehouses in the towns of Caguas, Comerío and Cayey. Inspired by the possibilities which the construction sector represented, Frade in 1909, decided to take a correspondence course in architecture in the American School of Correspondence in Chicago, Illinois. He earned his diploma on July 26, 1913, however he began to let it be known that he was an architect as early as 1912.

Among Frade's works as an architect were the new design of Cayey's municipal cemetery, a plaza dedicated to Eugenio María de Hostos, the buildings of two tobacco companies and various buildings in the commercial section of the town.

Legacy
On November 7, 1954, Ramón Frade died in his hometown at the age of 79 years. His widow donated his art works to the Cayey campus of the University of Puerto Rico. Cayey has honored his memory by naming a school and a public plaza after him. The Río Piedras campus of the University of Puerto Rico has a gallery with an exhibit of Frade's art works.

See also

List of Puerto Ricans

Notes

References

1875 births
1954 deaths
People from Cayey, Puerto Rico
Puerto Rican painters
University of Seville alumni
Puerto Rican architects
20th-century American painters
American male painters
20th-century American male artists